The International Union of Psychological Science, abbreviated IUPsyS or the Psy Union, is the global umbrella organization for psychology.

History 

Starting in 1889, an International Congress of Psychology has been held every few years. The International Congress of Psychology committee was established to organize this.  A few years after a statement by the United Nations which encouraged the establishment of international scientific societies, the 1948 International Congress in Edinburgh agreed to establish an international society similar to those which existed for other sciences. At the 1951 International Congress in Stockholm, the IUPsyS was officially established and statutes for it were accepted.

Current functions 

IUPsyS represents around one million psychologists worldwide. It is composed of 93 National Members (national psychology organizations or coalitions of national psychology organizations, one per country), 7 regional members, and 19 affiliate or special liaison organizations. Together, these organizations represent the large majority of organized psychology today.

The overall mission  of IUPsyS, as specified in its statutes, is the development, representation and advancement of psychology as a basic and applied science regionally, nationally, and internationally. This is accomplished through a variety of activities, including quadrennial international congresses (the IUPsyS is the sponsor of the International Congress of Psychology), regional conferences and workshops; publications; capacity building; development of standards; promulgation of policy; and information dissemination.

IUPsyS operates according to a strategic plan. IUPsyS is a member of the International Council for Science (ICSU), the International Social Science Council (ISSC), and is accredited with the World Health Organization (WHO), and the United Nations (ECOSOC and DPI).

The International Journal of Psychology (IJP) is the official journal of the IUPsyS, published by Psychology Press. It provides articles and reviews in every domain of psychology and informs the international community about issues of common interest in its International Platform Section.

The IUPsyS website provides information about IUPsyS and its activities. IUPsyS hosts Psychology Resources Around the World, a web portal with information on the organizations and structure of psychology in 190 countries, and links to psychology information and resources around the world. Other publications include a news Bulletin, Newsletter, informational brochures, and books, including a History of the Union, the International Handbook of Psychology, and an international compendium of Psychological Concepts.

The activities undertaken by the IUPsyS are generally organized through its three Standing Committees: Strategic Planning, Capacity Building, Publications and Communications, and their associated Work Groups.

The IUPsyS also continues to run the International Congress of Psychology.

Capacity Building Programs 
The IUPsyS sponsors a variety of capacity building programs. These include:

 The Biennial Advanced Research Training Seminar (ARTS)  program that provides training opportunities for scholars from low-income countries, to learn about new and up-to-date methodologies that they can carry forward to their own research programs and to other psychologists in their home communities; 
 Capacity Building Workshops at Regional Conferences of Psychology, and topic-driven capacity building workshop series.

In 2012, the IUPsyS sponsored a capacity building workshop on the Asian-Pacific region.

The IUPsyS supports cooperation and exchange among members of the world community of psychologists through regular communication with its National Member organizations, in the biennial meetings of the Assembly of the Union, and through its web and print publications.

International congresses and leadership

References

Further reading
 Mark R. Rosenzweig et al., History of the International Union of Psychological Science (IUPsyS), Psychology Press Ltd (2000),

External links 
 
 IUPsyS' International Journal of Psychology

Cross-cultural psychology
Members of the International Council for Science
Members of the International Science Council
Psychology-related professional associations